A moneyless economy or non-monetary economy is a system for the allocation of goods and services as well as for the assignment of work without payment of money. The simplest example is the family household, which can be a system of obligations nevertheless.

Moneyless economies are studied in econometry, in particular, game theory and mechanism design. See the section on microeconomics below.

When embedded in a monetary economy, a non-monetary economy represents work such as household labor, care giving, civic activity or even friends doing something for each other that does not have a monetary value but remains a vitally important part of the economy. While labor that results in monetary compensation is more highly valued than unpaid labor, nearly half of American productive work goes on outside of the market economy and is not represented in production measures such as the GDP.

Embedded non-monetary economies 
The non-monetary economy, typically embedded in a monetary economy, undertakes tasks that benefit society (whether through producing services, products, or making investments) that the monetary economy does not value.

The non-monetary economy makes the labor market more inclusive by valuing previously ignored forms of work. Some acknowledge the non-monetary economy as having a moral or socially conscious philosophy that attempts to end social exclusion by including poor and unemployed individuals, providing economic opportunities and access to services and goods. Community-based and grassroots movements encourage the community to be more participatory, thus providing a more democratic economic structure.

See also the non-monetary aspects of mutual aid as an organisational theory.

Core (or social) economy 
The social economy refers to the space between public and private sectors occupied by civil society, including community organizations, volunteering, social enterprises, and cooperatives. The social economy represents “a wide family of initiatives and organisational forms — i.e. a hybridisation of market, non-market (redistribution) and non- monetary (reciprocity) economies”. Rather than being fringe activities at the margins of the formal economy, this amounts to a significant level of activity: The "civil society" sector of the United Kingdom employs the equivalent of 1.4 million full-time employees (5% of the economically active population) and benefits from the unpaid efforts of the equivalent of 1.7 million full-time volunteers (5.6% of the economically active population), and contributes 6.8% of GDP.

Edgar S. Cahn developed the concept of the core economy to describe the informal social networks that he considered the bedrock of society, which he felt were eroding as monetary economies de-legitimized them. The core economy as he defined it consists of social capital, and generates collective efficacy that's of critical importance to the core economy.

Collective efficacy refers to the effectiveness of informal mechanisms by which residents themselves achieve public order. More specifically, this is the shared vision or fusion of shared willingness of residents to intervene and create social trust (the sense of engagement and ownership of public spaces), intervening in the lives of other residents to counter crime, increase voting, or encourage residents to recycle. These informal mechanisms are what Cahn calls social capital, a public good provided by citizens who participate to build up their communities (from raising children and taking care of the elderly to volunteer work). Cahn believes this kind of work is essential to a democratic and stable society.

Unlike a market economy, the core economy relies on specialization reinforced by a "do-it-yourself" attitude that “Builds self-esteem and a voluntary interdependence that replaces involuntary dependence that comes w/ industrial and market specialization” and where self-sufficiency is based upon interdependent family or community units (instead of a market economy's atomized individual). This model reduces or eliminates the involuntary dependence that comes with the market economy's strict division of labor. It also focuses on alternative distribution mechanisms to pricing, using instead normative considerations like need, fairness, altruism, moral obligation, or contribution.

Collective efficacy and social capital are central to two very successful examples of civic-based, non-monetary economies: time banks and local exchange trading systems (LETS). These work systems provide alternative forms of currency, earned through time spent in directly serving the community, e.g. working in the community garden, recycling, repairing leaky faucets, babysitting. These units of time can be used to ask other members of work systems to do jobs they need, or may act as a forum in which special jobs or needs can be communicated and traded. These systems operate to a large degree outside of the monetary economy, though do not supersede the monetary economy or seek a return to systems of barter.

Time banks 

A time bank is a community-based organization which brings people and local organizations together to help each other, utilizing previously untapped resources and skills, valuing work which is normally unrewarded, and valuing people who find themselves marginalized from the conventional economy. These are things that family or friends might normally do for each other, but in the absence of supportive reciprocal networks, the time bank recreates those connections. These interactions are based upon the exchange of hours spent on an activity, where time dollars are the unit of measure/ currency. They are traded for hours of labor, and are redeemable for services from other members.

Community building 
In 1998, Redefining Progress estimated that housework amounted to $1.911 trillion, roughly one-fourth of the U.S. GDP that year. As of 2010, the Bureau of Economic Analysis found that household work, if tracked, would increase the GDP by 26%. More than a decade later, household work continues to provide a key source of foundational support to the domestic economy. Such household work includes cleaning, cooking, care giving, and educating children.

There may be a closed household economy, where a specific (perhaps familial) group of individuals benefits from the work performed.

In extreme cases of survival, the open nature of the household economy is most evident. Food, clothing, toiletries, and basic necessities were often shared or exchanged amongst war-torn, impoverished families in East Europe post-communism. Cooking, cleaning, clothes-making, and forms of work may seem to be intuitively thought of as work. An Australian study (1992) determined that an estimated 380 million person-hours per week were spent on these types of unpaid activities, compared to 272 million hours per week at paid work.

A large portion of these hours can be attributed to nurturing. Nurturing can take two forms, in terms of raising children and nursing the sick, elderly, and infirm, both still usually expected from women and girls. Children represent not only a product of a household but an asset to the community as a whole. In the home, kids may provide help in the form of chores and so are an asset. In a greater sense, children are a public good: an investment in which time, energy, and money are spent so that they can become stable adults who share in reducing national debt and contributing to Social Security, thus a public good. As children mature and learn, they have the potential to benefit society in whatever profession or products they eventually produce.

The products and services produced within a home are open to the non-market economy at large. Society as a whole benefits from this unpaid work, whether in an immediate manner or a more abstract, macro scale.

The other form of home-based nurturing also serves benefits society as a whole. Care giving provides assistance for those who are elderly, disabled, suffering terminal illness or chronic illness, or are generally frail or in need of assistance. Someone who cares for someone in any of these positions is a caregiver. This is largely provided unpaid by friends or family of the patient.

Care giving often exceeds the nursing tasks that come with caring for someone who is ill or recovering from surgery. Often, caregivers also must maintain the dwelling, provide meals, and interact with medical providers and doctors, among other responsibilities. Nearly 80% of labor that keeps seniors out of nursing homes is unpaid labor by families.

In 1997, the value of work produced by caregivers was estimated at $196 billion. The figure was $375 billion for 2007. At the time, only $32 billion was spent on formal health care and $83 billion spent on nursing home care by the federal government. According to these statistics, only half as much money is spent on nursing and home health care as is necessary. These numbers do not take into account the financial burden as well as emotion work that is an inescapable part of this work.

The same research estimated that in 1997 caregivers would have received $8.18 as the hourly wage. As of May 2013, the hourly wage was estimated at $9.14 when averaging the minimum wage in Florida and the median wage for Home Health Aides. Caregiving requires a large dedication, as much as 22 to 70 hours a week. An estimated 25.8 million people as of 1997 performed these tasks.

Caregiving has a disproportionate effect on women and white households. The cost of caregiving is exorbitant, nearly five times what Medicaid would have spent on long-term care, meaning only wealthy families can afford to do this type of in-home care. The intersection of class and race in this phenomenon is an important place to explore as less advantaged families will have to rely on government care, potentially at the risk of having less quality care. These statistics also highlight a differential effect on women, showing that women disproportionately do caregiving work.

Valuing all work changes perceptions of what constitutes valuable work. Acknowledging a non-monetary economy may change the ways in which the unemployed, poor, women, and other stigmatized persons’ work is valued. It can allow citizens to see their community as a more cohesive, intertwined system that deserves their time and energy. Exploring this economy also exposes numerous areas of help that do not have enough support from the public and private sectors. Education and caregiving in particular highlight where assistance is needed and often not provided.

Barter economies 

Barter economies also constitute an important form of non-monetized interaction, although for the most part this kind of interaction is viewed largely as a temporary fix as an economic system is in transition. It is also usually considered a side effect of a tight monetary policy such as in a liquidity crisis, like that of 1990s Russia where barter transactions accounted for 50 percent of sales for midsize enterprises and 75 percent for large ones.

Moneyless interaction of individuals with the monetary economy 
This concerns individuals who agree with a participant of the monetary economy to exchange goods or services (reciprocation) or to receive them without any obligation (genuine gift.) For instance, begging for anything but money, perhaps in exchange of religious services, as is the case for mendicants. Examples of individuals: 
 Raphael Fellmer
 Heidemarie Schwermer
 Carolien Hoogland
 Mildred Lisette Norman

Free contributions to the intellectual common good 
This is a case of mutualism (see macroeconomies below) embedded in the monetary economy and restricted to intellectual labor. Typical examples are posting questions and answers on an internet forum and, of course, Wikipedia. In these cases, subsistence is usually guaranteed by the monetary economy. Categories of such contributions are Commons-based peer production, Open source, Creative Commons license, and so on.

Non-monetary microeconomies 
This concerns moneyless economies which are often embedded in a monetary economy but not necessarily interacting with it. (The distinction from other categories is somewhat artificial.) Examples of interacting economies are families and larger communities, like the one in Auroville and Twin Oaks, where members are supposed to work 42 hours per week on average and jobs are assigned manually. Such labor quota (or labor expectations) seem to be the only form of non-monetary time-based economies.

Publicly known utilities
Suppose first that cost and profits are publicly known. In game-theory, markets initially were modeled as barter for sake of purity. However, the market models use utilities. These naturally lead to introduce idealised money as an exchange commodity, which has a transferable utility. This greatly simplifies models and solutions. Yet, so-called games without side-payment have gained attention because of the Internet economy, for example, as a model of cooperation between autonomous systems.

Privately known utilities
Often, participants can misreport their properties, like their preferences. Using so-called mechanism design one can try to arrange the economy so that such misreporting is discouraged. One such case is rationing, which is a mechanism for allocating scarce goods. An example is uniform rationing, which (loosely speaking) serves first who asks least. Uniform rationing can also be arranged to more or less the same effect by paying certain prices.

If the available amount is collected from multiple participants (the suppliers) and redistributed among the demanders along certain links (bipartite rationing) then a similar mechanism is the so-called egalitarian transfer. This is further generalised to the uniform gains rule, which is based on a so-called leximin ordering.

Other examples of mechanisms without money (yet with numerical utilities) are truthful resource allocations like the partial allocation mechanism, which is an approximation of so-called proportionally fair allocation of divisible resources; furthermore, combinatorial auctions; supply-demand clearing; and other market design, in particular, matching like paired kidney donation, hiring of new doctors, school choice programs, and auctions of radio spectra. Voting (of which there are many kinds) is yet another alternative. Even if money is not used, there may be a unit of exchange, for example, when a present profit is "paid" by renouncing a promised profit.

In 2009, researchers at Microsoft called for more research into truthful (i.e. strategy-proof) non-monetary mechanisms, such as allocations on the internet. For the ensuing investigations, see the article by Han and others in the section on further reading.

Non-monetary macroeconomies 
The following is a list of moneyless systems which intend (or did) encompass an entire society.

Moneyless systems having a technological component 
The following systems aim at moneyless societies, often aided by technology.
 Technology-driven, often centralised ("resource based") societies: the Zeitgeist movement, its related projects named Venus, Auravana, or Kadagaya in Peru, and the Money Free Party.
 The Technocracy movement, which proposes to replace money with energy certificates.
 Large-scale algorithmic distribution (as envisaged by Stefan Heidenreich) for negotiating "matched transactions," each of which "has effects beyond all immediate participants." Yet, the procedure emulates money "when our profiles, our likes, and our consumer histories are used to calculate who will buy what and where." The transactions are recorded and, along with utility/urgency and reputation/personal history, the "matches" are determined.
 Paradism, which heavily relies on automation.
 The Unhampered Individual Rewards movement, which involves using numbers (or other symbols) not representing any fixed-amount physical property (cash, gold, etc.) to reward individual-person and individual-enterprise merit in terms of productivity, creativity, utility, or necessity of the work performed/product or service provided, not limited by monetary budget constraints or pricing instability.  The numbers allotted to any individual account represent a cash-free income, and expenditure is accomplished with personally written check, purchase-card swipe or electronic transfer.  The amount in each individual account is adjusted according to income or expenditure by simple math (addition or subtraction) which only represent changes in the economy of the individual involved, not in the collective economy.  The collective economy is dependent only on the amount of natural and human resources available needed to produce a particular type of product or service, not the amount of cash in print and in circulation.  The "cashless society" movement is considered to be a precursor stage for this movement.

Other moneyless systems 
In the following, technology is less emphasised. The boundaries between the below systems are often blurred. The example of transplantation is international but could be classified as a micro-economy, too.
 Mutualism in the sense of a (moneyless) economic theory. People contribute to a community without payment not only to help but also because they expect to be helped by a member of the community when in need (a selfish interpretation of solidarity.) So, the term 'mutualism' is understood as aid by the community and not necessarily reciprocation. For example, if a transplantation center donates a kidney to another center, then its entitlement to receive a kidney from the community is increased by means of its export balance. Other examples are the anarchist communities during the Spanish Civil War, where quota and rations were used for distribution, and the Minka communal work.
 Debt system, as used in manorialism or with the aid of the tally stick. To continue the previous example, if a transplantation center donates a liver to another center, then the recipient center is obliged to return one at the earliest occasion. To save transportation cost, such obligations are passed from one creditor center to the other in the obvious way. The transplantation clearing house could further diminish transportation cost by deferring such alienation of the obligations. This would be similar to the fairs from which the banks and government-issued money evolved.
 The redistribution economy, which is a more authoritarian case of mutualism. For example, the Incas and possibly, also the empire of Majapahit.
 A combination of mutualism and redistribution: Uruganda and similar economies like Umuganda/Isarongo and Ubuntu. These economies are based on culture rather than a fool-proof system.
 Labor vouchers, which are inalienable certificates of hours worked.
 Non-monetary (state) communist currents, ranging from libertarian proposals to the harsh reality of Democratic Kampuchea. Many communists and socialists envisaged a moneyless society.
 Gift economies: other than the word suggests, the gift in such economies usually comes with an obligation to do something in return. 
 Altruistic society: as proposed by Mark Boyle, a moneyless economy is a model "on the basis of materials and services being shared unconditionally" that is, without explicit or formal exchange.
 The subsistence economy, which caters only for essentials, often without money.
 Calculation in kind, which (in a restricted form) dispenses with any general unit of calculation when exchanging goods or services.
 Natural economy, where resources are allocated through direct bartering, entitlement by law, or sharing out according to traditional custom.
 Non-market ecosocialism as advocated by Anitra Nelson: as for the nonmonetary aspect, each household "guesstimates" its basic needs, which are met in return for "collective production as a community obligation." The production, distribution, and procurement of goods and services from "more distant communities" are collectively agreed on.

Policy implications of embedded non-monetary economies 
The UK in particular has been targeted by the government since the New Labor administration of the mid-1990s onwards—the social economy has been developed as a means of delivering effective public services, and mobilizing active citizenship. In 2002, for example, the Department for Trade and Industry (DTI) 2002 launched the Strategy for Social Enterprise to develop “the government’s vision … of dynamic and sustainable social enterprise strengthening an inclusive and growing economy.” The intent of the Strategy was to create an enabling policy environment for social enterprise, to make social enterprises better businesses, and to establish the value of social enterprise, in order that the sector may help to deliver on a range of policy agendas: productivity and competitiveness; contributing to socially inclusive wealth creation; neighborhood regeneration; public service reform; and developing an inclusive society and active citizenship.

However, by and large current policy does not reflect the implications of a system that does not validate actions that transmit community values, provide support, generates consensus, etc. These actions in the past were subsidized by cheap or free labor derived from subordinate groups, like women and ethnic or racial minorities, who as a result of entering the workforce to receive monetary validation negate these positive public goods.

The biggest issue that time bank coordinators face, as a result, is funding. Time banks do not rely on volunteers, but require financial support — to pay the time broker’s salary, for a publicly accessible drop-in office, for marketing costs — to successfully attract socially excluded people in deprived neighborhoods. While many UK time banks have been supported by grant funding from the National Lottery, over time it becomes harder to secure ongoing funding, or to increase the funding available for time banks overall, and established projects close while new ones are begun elsewhere.

United States time banks and the IRS 
Organizations that administer time banks, barter networks, or currencies may register for tax-exempt status under section 501(c)(3) as non-profit organizations working to benefit the community. The IRS has recognized some time banks as tax exempt; it is harder to obtain exemptions for a barter network or local currency, as they are harder to prove as operating purely on a basis of service to the community.

Being a time bank alone does not enable an organization to obtain tax exemption under 501(c)(3). If, instead of a time bank, an organization operates a local currency or barter network, such an organization may be deemed to be operating for the private benefit of individuals, even if those individuals are members of a charitable class. An exchange platform that is designed for use of the broader community, and not specifically for a charitable class, may not be considered a tax-exempt activity for a 501(c)(3) organization.

See also

 Gift economy
 Community currency
 Controlled market
 Distributism
 Economic freedom
 Envy-free item allocation
 Fair cake-cutting
 Free market
 Informal sector
 Local exchange trading system
 Market socialism
 Market structure
 Mixed economy
 Mutual aid (organization theory)
 Neoclassical economics
 Planned economy
 Post-capitalism
 Promise theory
 Regulated market
 Social market economy
 Socialist market economy

Further reading
  (Refers to models without transfers.)
  (Mentions many more non-monetary mechanisms.)
 
 
  
 
 Deguchi A., Kajitani S., Nakajima T., Ohashi H., Watanabe T. (2020) From Monetary to Nonmonetary Society. In: Hitachi-UTokyo Laboratory (H-UTokyo Lab.) (eds) Society 5.0. Springer, Singapore https://link.springer.com/chapter/10.1007/978-981-15-2989-4_6
 Rakitskii, B.V. (1979) Law of Economy of Time. In: The Great Soviet Encyclopedia, 3d edition. Refers to K. Marx and F. Engels, Das Kapital, "Soch., 2nd ed., vol. 46, parti, p. 117". https://encyclopedia2.thefreedictionary.com/Economy+of+Time%2c+Law+of
 
 
Consult worldcat.org to locate the last two publications.

References

Economic systems